The NFL Honors is an annual awards presentation in the National Football League (NFL).  
Since 2022, the ceremony is held on the Thursday before the Super Bowl, in the game's host city. The presentation was pre-recorded for same-day broadcast from 2012 to 2020. The first ever live broadcast of the ceremony was on February 6, 2021.

List of ceremonies

Categories and awards

References

External links
 

 
Awards established in 2011